Long Knife Peak is located in the Clark Range, Glacier National Park in the U.S. state of Montana. It is also the most northerly peak and land area in the contiguous United States above . Long Knife Peak is on an east west ridgeline identified as the "Boundary Mountains" on the USGS 7.5 minute topo quad and this extended ridge, with peak 8864, also contains the most northerly named (numbered) peak and land area in the contiguous United States above .

Climate

Based on the Köppen climate classification, Long Knife Peak is located in an alpine subarctic climate zone characterized by long, usually very cold winters, and short, cool to mild summers. Temperatures can drop below −10 °F with wind chill factors below −30 °F.

See also
 List of mountains and mountain ranges of Glacier National Park (U.S.)

References

Mountains of Flathead County, Montana
Mountains of Glacier National Park (U.S.)
Mountains of Montana